Yeshivat Ohr Yerushalayim  (ישיבת אור ירושלים) is an American yeshiva for the study of Torah. It caters to English-speaking students spending a year in Israel after high school.

During the summer, the yeshiva houses the NCSY summer kollel program.

Faculty
The faculty is headed by Rabbi Noach Victor, who serves as the Rosh Yeshiva ("head/dean"), and comprises a large staff of rabbis.

References

External links
 Official website

Orthodox yeshivas in Israel
Educational institutions established in 1980